Christopher Clemence "Cle" Kooiman (born July 3, 1963) is an American former soccer defender. He played professionally in both Mexico and the United States including the first Major Indoor Soccer League, Western Soccer Alliance, American Professional Soccer League and Major League Soccer.  He earned twelve caps, scoring one goal, with the U.S. national soccer team in 1993 and 1994.  He was a member of the U.S. team at the 1994 FIFA World Cup.

Club career

College
Cle Kooiman was born in Ontario, California, and attended San Diego State University.  In 1982, he was named to the All Far West team.

MISL
In 1982, Kooiman began his professional career playing for the Los Angeles Lazers of the Major Indoor Soccer League.  He would remain with the Lazers until 1987.

WSL/APSL
In 1989, he began his outdoor professional career with the California Kickers of the Western Soccer League (WSL).  That year, he was named as a league First Team All Star.  He moved to the San Diego Nomads for the 1990 season.  However, by that time, the WSL had merged with the American Soccer League to form the American Professional Soccer League.

Mexico
At the end of the 1990, Kooiman moved to Mexico.  He began with Cobras de Ciudad Juarez, of the Mexican Premier Division before moving to Cruz Azul in Mexican Premier League.  While with Cruz Azul, he became the first U.S. citizen to captain a Mexican soccer team.  In 1994, he moved to Atlético Morelia.

MLS
In 1996, the newly established Major League Soccer (MLS) distributed "marque" players throughout the league's teams.  Kooiman was allocated to the Tampa Bay Mutiny.  He would play two seasons with the Mutiny, but at the end of the 1997 season, the Mutiny left him exposed in the 1997 MLS Expansion Draft.  The Miami Fusion selected Kooiman in the first round (14th overall) and he would play a single season for that team.

International
Kooiman earned his first cap with the  national team in 1993. He would eventually play 12 games with the national team, scoring a single goal and participating in the 1994 FIFA World Cup, where he played the full 90 minutes in the U.S.'s opening game against Switzerland.

Personal life
Kooiman was diagnosed with aggressive prostate cancer in February of 2018.

References

External links
 Los Angeles Lazers stats

American expatriate soccer players
American people of Dutch descent
Western Soccer Alliance players
California Kickers players
American Professional Soccer League players
Nomads Soccer Club players
United States men's international soccer players
Association football defenders
Major Indoor Soccer League (1978–1992) players
Los Angeles Lazers players
Tampa Bay Mutiny players
Miami Fusion players
Cruz Azul footballers
Atlético Morelia players
Liga MX players
American expatriate sportspeople in Mexico
Expatriate footballers in Mexico
1993 Copa América players
1993 CONCACAF Gold Cup players
1994 FIFA World Cup players
American soccer coaches
Soccer players from California
People from Ontario, California
1963 births
Living people
Major League Soccer players
Major League Soccer All-Stars
American soccer players